Kamil Kosowski (born 30 August 1977) is a Polish former professional footballer who played as a midfielder.

Club career
Born in Ostrowiec Świętokrzyski, Kosowski started out playing for his home town club KSZO Ostrowiec Świętokrzyski.

Wisła Kraków and loans
Kosowski became renowned in Poland after his performances for Wisła Kraków in the 2002–03 UEFA Cup matches.

He moved to 1. FC Kaiserslautern in Germany in 2003 and then on to Southampton FC where he played the 2005–06 season on a year-long loan and was recalled to the Polish national team. He scored once in the league for Southampton, in a 1–1 draw with Hull City.

After being on loan at A.C. Chievo Verona, Kosowski returned to Wisła Kraków and played very well for the first half of the season as the player with most assists in the first half of the league campaign after setting up nine goals in 13 games. However, on 14 January 2008, Wisła Kraków and Kosowski mutually voided the remainder of his contract as a result of not coming to a compromise on a new deal.

Cádiz
Kosowski signed a two-and-a-half-year contract with Spanish second division team Cádiz CF on 25 January 2008. Cadiz finished 20th in the Segunda División in 2007–08 and were relegated to the Segunda División B.

APOEL

On 7 July 2008, Kosowski was transferred to APOEL from Cádiz CF and signed a two-year contract. In his first official appearance with APOEL, Kosowski scored the only goal in the Super Cup match against Anorthosis and APOEL won the title. In his first year in the club, he helped APOEL to win the Cyprus Championship 2008–09, showing his class and was one of the most valuable players of the club. The next season, he won the Super Cup again and he also appeared in five official group stage matches of the 2009–10 UEFA Champions League with APOEL. He stated that his participation with APOEL in the UEFA Champions League was one of the most important moments in his career.

Apollon Limassol
On 31 May 2010, he signed a two-year contract with Apollon Limassol but at the end of the season his contract was mutually terminated.

GKS Bełchatów
In July 2011, he joined GKS Bełchatów on a one-year contract.

International career
Kosowski was capped 52 times for Poland, scoring four goals.

In August 2005 he was part of the national team's triumphant performance at the Valeri Lobanovsky Memorial Tournament 2005.

He was selected to the 23-men national squad for the 2006 FIFA World Cup finals held in Germany, but he played only about 15 minutes against Ecuador.

International goals

References

External links
 
 
 

Living people
1977 births
People from Ostrowiec Świętokrzyski
Sportspeople from Świętokrzyskie Voivodeship
Polish footballers
Poland international footballers
Poland under-21 international footballers
Association football midfielders
KSZO Ostrowiec Świętokrzyski players
Wisła Kraków players
Górnik Zabrze players
GKS Bełchatów players
1. FC Kaiserslautern players
Southampton F.C. players
A.C. ChievoVerona players
APOEL FC players
Cádiz CF players
Ekstraklasa players
Serie A players
Bundesliga players
English Football League players
Segunda División players
Cypriot First Division players
Expatriate footballers in Germany
Expatriate footballers in England
Expatriate footballers in Cyprus
Expatriate footballers in Italy
Expatriate footballers in Spain
Polish expatriate footballers
Polish expatriate sportspeople in Spain
Polish expatriate sportspeople in England
Polish expatriate sportspeople in Germany
2006 FIFA World Cup players